Hickory Creek is a stream in Ste. Genevieve County in the U.S. state of Missouri. It is a tributary of Establishment Creek.

Hickory Creek was so named on account of hickory timber in the area.

See also
List of rivers of Missouri

References

Rivers of Ste. Genevieve County, Missouri
Rivers of Missouri